Yuhi Kabhi  is a 1994 Bollywood film produced by S.P.Kukreja, directed by Kumar Bhatia starring Anil Dhawan, Ashok Kumar, Parikshat Sahni, Bhagwan Dada, Archana Puran Singh, Manisha Koirala, Tinnu Anand and Kumar Bhatia. Rajoo lives alone and works in a decent company. He also has a girlfriend, who he intends to marry, that being Pooja. God suddenly appears to Rajoo one day and asks him to spread His word. Naive Rajoo does so, and this results in chaos, misunderstandings, and confusion. And as a result poor Rajoo is hauled up in Court, and the only one witness that can save Rajoo is God, but will God make an earthly appearance?

Soundtrack

References

External links

1990s Hindi-language films
Films scored by Nikhil-Vinay